Meir Max Bineth (Max Bennett) (27 June 1917 – 21 December 1954) was a lieutenant colonel in the Israeli Intelligence.

Biography
Bineth was born in Szombathely, Hungary, the grandson of the scholar Jacob Obermeyer. He grew up in Cologne, from 1919 until 1935, when he and his parents left Nazi Germany and emigrated to Palestine.

Meir's last duty and mission was as an Israeli intelligence spy (Secret Fighter) in Egypt, from 1952 to the end of 1954. He was sent there undercover as a German businessman, representing various German firms – primarily "von Laufenberg", a firm manufacturing equipment for the disabled and crippled. He was the first Israeli intelligence agent sent to an enemy country under a German identity and was likely partly selected due to his early years in Germany.

Meir's mission in Egypt was to gather information for Israeli Intelligence about the strength of the Egyptian army, the power of the military industry, Egyptian strategy and intentions toward Israel, the activities of significant anti-Israeli bodies, propaganda, etc.

Many doors of Egypt's top military echelon opened before him; he became acquainted with General Muhammad Naguib, then President of Egypt. He also built relations with German military and intelligence personnel and ranking ex-Nazi "advisors" who had found refuge in Egypt after the Second World War. Some of them were scientists who were helping Egypt develop missiles that could potentially threaten Israel.

While working in Egypt, Meir was nominated as a consultant engineer at the "Anglo Egyptian Motors Company" (the German branch of the Ford Motor Company in Egypt), and suggested several projects to help improve Egypt's economy, believing that a crucial reason that generates wars between nations and communities is the lack of economic and social equilibrium; among other things he wrote in his prison cell for his defense was the line "I think that the principal cause of wars is the age-old fear existing between man and communities that there may not be enough bread for all."

Meir's cover and conduct were convenient—he had German citizenship, grew up with German culture, literature, and music, and German was his mother tongue. During the last seven months of his secret mission in Egypt, his wife Jane (South African in origin) and daughter joined him.

Bineth was caught and arrested after the failure of false flag Operation Susannah, an incident later known as the Lavon Affair. Meir had been ordered by a senior officer in Israel to deliver money for the groups' needs and had met Marcelle Ninio a few times. Ninio was the last to be caught; under torture, she gave a description of Meir's car, which led to his capture.

After five months of interrogation and torture, on the day before his trial, Meir committed suicide in his prison cell (his wife and child were in Europe). He realized that there was no way out for him and wanted to avoid public hanging, which was the fate awaiting him after conviction.

His body was re-interred in the Mount Herzl military cemetery in Jerusalem in 1959.

See also
 Lavon Affair
 Moshe Marzouk
 Azzam Azzam
 Ouda Tarabin 
 Ilan Grapel affair
 Naama Issachar affair

References

 The Lavon Affair: The Lavon Affair, The Ring Acts and is Caught, Max (Meir) Binett (or Benett)
  The Israeli and Anglo-American Jewish Discourse, Binnet was a major in the Israel Defense Forces who was already known and wanted in Iraq for previous espionage activity there. His mission in Egypt appears to have been far more substantial than Operation Susannah, with which he had no direct connection.

External links
 
 
 
 

Amnon Yona: Missions with No Traces=https://books.google.com/books?id=7viWqKOsdZcC&pg=PA259&lpg=PA259&dq (pages=256–260)

1917 births
1954 deaths
1954 suicides
Hungarian emigrants to Germany
German emigrants to Mandatory Palestine
People from Szombathely
Aliyah Bet
People of the Mossad
Egypt–Israel relations
1950s in Egypt
Israeli spies
Jewish Egyptian history
Israeli torture victims
Spies who died in prison custody
Israeli people who died in prison custody
Israeli military personnel who committed suicide
People who committed suicide in prison custody
Suicides in Egypt
Burials at Mount Herzl